Valdezcaray  is a ski area situated  near the resort town of Ezcaray in the upper Oja Valley of the Sierra de la Demanda, Iberian System (province of La Rioja, Spain).

The resort
It has 22 km of marked pistes, and is a growing family resort which has greatly improved its facilities in recent years. The highest point is San Lorenzo peak at 2125 m AMSL, with a vertical descent of 600 m.

The base of the area includes the basic ski services and is located at an altitude of 1530 m AMSL. From there, the main chair lift provides access to the pistes. All the hotels and apartments are in the resort town of Ezcaray, 13 km downhill from the ski area.

Lifts
Almost all of the resort's lifts are new and high capacity. The resort has:

 6 chair lifts.
 1 ski tow.

Pistes
The resort offers 24 pistes of different difficulties:

 6 Beginner. 
  6 Easy.
  10 Intermediate.
  2 Expert.

Services

 2 restaurants.
 1 skiing school.
 1 ski hiring store.

See also
Picos de Urbión

External links
 http://www.valdezcaray.es - Official resort site.

Ski areas and resorts in Spain
Sports venues in La Rioja (Spain)